The Socialist Party of the National Left (PSIN) was a political party in Argentina, founded in 1962 by Jorge Abelardo Ramos, Jorge Enea Spilimbergo and others, representative of the National Left Argentine political tradition.

The political philosopher Ernesto Laclau was a member of the PSIN until 1969, when the British historian Eric Hobsbawm supported his entrance to Oxford.

See also 

National Left

References

External links
Izquierda Nacional website
Izquierda Nacional English website

Socialist parties in Argentina
Defunct political parties in Argentina
Political parties established in 1962
1962 establishments in Argentina
Political parties with year of disestablishment missing